Mazocraeidea is an order in the subclass Polyopisthocotylea within class Monogenea.

The species of this order have various structures in the clamps of their posterior attachment organ, including additional sclerites in the Gastrocotylidae and related families. However, these additional sclerites, and even the clamps themselves, are lacking in certain members of the family Protomicrocotylidae.

Families
According to PESI
 Anthocotylidae Bychowsky, 1957
 Axinidae Monticelli, 1903
 Chauhaneidae Euzet & Trilles, 1960
 Diclidophoridae Fuhrmann, 1928
 Diplozoidae
 Discocotylidae Price, 1936
 Gotocotylidae Yamaguti, 1963
 Heteraxinidae Unnithan, 1957
 Hexostomatidae Price, 1936
 Mazocraeidae Price, 1936
 Microcotylidae Taschenberg, 1879
 Octolabeidae
 Plectanocotylidae Monticelli, 1903
 Protomicrocotylidae Johnston & Tiegs, 1922
 Pyragraphoridae Yamaguti, 1963

According to the World Register of Marine Species
 Allodiscocotylidae
 Allopyragraphoridae
 Anchorophoridae
 Anthocotylidae
 Axinidae
 Bychowskicotylidae
 Chauhaneidae
 Diclidophoridae
 Diplozoidae
 Discocotylidae
 Gastrocotylidae
 Gotocotylidae
 Heteraxinidae
 Heteromicrocotylidae
 Hexostomatidae
 Macrovalvitrematidae
 Mazocraeidae
 Megamicrocotylidae
 Microcotylidae
 Monaxinoididae
 Neothoracocotylidae
 Octolabeidae
 Paramonaxinidae
 Plectanocotylidae
 Protomicrocotylidae
 Pseudodiclidophoridae
 Pterinotrematidae
 Pyragraphoridae
 Bicotylophoridae accepted as Discocotylidae
 Cemocotylidae accepted as Heteraxinidae
 Thoracocotylidae accepted as Neothoracocotylidae

References

Platyhelminthes orders
Polyopisthocotylea